C14 is an untarred road in Namibia. It starts in Walvis Bay, goes through Helmeringhausen and ends in Goageb. It is 643 km long.

Tourism 
The following tourist attractions can be seen while driving along C14 road: ; Kuiseb River and Canyon; Gaub River Canyon; the Tropic of Capricorn road sign, which is located at the following geo coordinates: -23.50019, 15.77216; Solitaire.

References

Roads in Namibia
Erongo Region
Buildings and structures in Khomas Region
Buildings and structures in Hardap Region
Buildings and structures in ǁKaras Region